Sindlesham is an estate village in the borough of Wokingham in Berkshire, England. The River Loddon flows just to the west. A chapel was built in Sindlesham as early as 1220. A large 19th-century, three-storey watermill on the Loddon has more recently become part of a hotel. 

Nearby is the estate of Bearwood House, built in 1864 by John Walter, the then proprietor of The Times newspaper, now Reddam House, a private secondary school. Also in the village are Bearwood Primary School, St Catherine Bearwood Church, the offices of Winnersh Parish Council, the control centre for the National Grid covering England and Wales, and the Berkshire Masonic Centre at Sindlesham Court. Facilities in the village include a golf course (Bearwood Lakes) and the Nirvana Spa Health Club.

References

External links

Further notes on Sindlesham

Villages in Berkshire
Borough of Wokingham